Women in Cell Biology (WCIB) is a subcommittee of the American Society for Cell Biology (ASCB) created to promote women in cell biology and present awards.

History 
A group of women were unhappy with the lack of recognition in ASCB.  In 1971, Virginia Walbot gathered a group of women to meet at the annual ASCB meetings and WICB began.  The goal was to provide a space for women to talk and network with other women in the field, learn about job opportunities, and promote women in academia.  Newsletters were distributed containing job listings and news of powerful women in biology.  Originally, WICB was not accepted by ASCB; the newsletter was not funded and later discontinued in the 1970s. WICB was established as a committee within ASCB in 1994.

Activities 
Currently, WICB meets annually at ASCB meetings and has a column in the ASCB newsletter. The goals of WICB are to nominate and give awards and communicate through the newsletter.

Awards 
WICB awards the following annually:
 WICB Junior Award for Excellence in Research
 WICB Mid-Career Award for Excellence in Research
 Sandra K. Masur Senior Leadership Award

References 

American Society for Cell Biology
Cell